Benjamin Lester Lester (1779 – 1838) was a British politician.

Lester was born in Poole and worked as a merchant, in the shipping trade with Newfoundland.  He stood in an 1809 by-election in Poole, and won the seat as a Whig.  He supported the abolition of slavery.  He held his seat at each election until 1835, when he stood down.

In 1815, Lester served as Mayor of Poole.

References

1779 births
1838 deaths
Mayors of Poole
People from Poole
UK MPs 1812–1818
UK MPs 1818–1820
UK MPs 1820–1826
UK MPs 1826–1830
UK MPs 1830–1831
UK MPs 1831–1832
UK MPs 1832–1835
Whig (British political party) MPs for English constituencies